The 2022–23 Premier League of Belize is the tenth season of the Premier League of Belize, the highest competitive football league in Belize, after it was founded in 2011. The league commenced in July 2022 and is scheduled to end in mid 2023. The season is divided into two halves (opening and closing), each crowning one champion.

Teams
There were eight teams that participated in the 2022–23 season. From the 2021–22 FFB Top League, administered by the Football Federation of Belize, four teams returned to the league. These were Altitude,  San Pedro Pirates, Verdes and Wagiya. After a brief hiatus from top level football, Belmopan Bandits also returned to the league. The three other teams were made up of Benque Viejo United, who played under the license of Police United, Progresso from Orange Walk, who previously competed in amateur level competitions in the country, and Port Layola, a newly formed team from Belize City.

Opening season
The General Manager of the league, Wіlhеlm Міguеl ѕtated that thе format of the oреnіng sеаѕоn wіll initially fеаturе а dоublе rоund rоbіn рhаѕе. The top fоur ranked tеаmѕ will then quаlіfу for a hоmе аnd аwау ѕеmіfіnаls, with thе wіnnеrѕ mееting іn a twо-gаmе fіnаlѕ. The opening season commenced on 30 July 2022.

League table

Results

Playoffs

Semifinals 

Game One

Game Two

Finals 

Game One

Game Two

Season statistics

Top scorers

 Includes playoff goals.

Hat-tricks

Closing season
All eight teams that participated in the opening season participated in the closing season.

The format will be the same as the opening season with one league consisting of the eight teams, who will play each other twice, with the top four teams advancing to the end of season playoffs. The closing season commenced on 14 January 2023.

In February 2023, part way through the closing season, Belmopan Bandits changed their name to International Futbol Club, after striking a sponsorship deal with a team from Mexico.

Also in February 2023, the Football Federation of Belize Арреаlѕ Соmmіttее ruled thаt Port Layola fіеldеd аn іnеlіgіblе рlауеr in their 2–1 away win аgаіnѕt Verdes оn 29 January 2023. A 3–0 victory was subsequently awarded to Verdes. In addition, the goals scored from this game were annulled, meaning Michael Palacio and Gilroy Thurton from Port Layola and Marco Zavala from Verdes lose a goal each.

League table

Results

Season statistics

Top scorers

Hat-tricks

References

Top level Belizean football league seasons
1
Belize